Howard Korder is an American screenwriter and playwright.  He is the author of the 1988 coming-of-age play Boy's Life, which earned him a Pulitzer Prize for Drama nomination. His play Search and Destroy was adapted into a film in 1995. Among the screenplays he has written are The Passion of Ayn Rand and Lakeview Terrace. He is also one of the writers of Boardwalk Empire.

References

External links 
 
 

American dramatists and playwrights
Living people
Date of birth missing (living people)
Year of birth missing (living people)